List of viscounts:

Sunifred c.858
Ermenard c. 918
Guitard c. 966-985
Udalard I (son) 985-1014
Geribert (brother, regent) 985-?
Ermengarda (daughter of Udalard I) 1014-1063
Bernat de Santmartí  (married with Ermengarda) 1014-?
Guislabert I bishop of Barcelona (son of Udalard I) regent
Udalard II (son of Ermengarda) 1063-1076
Guislabert II (son) 1076-1126
Reverter (son) 1126-1142
Berenguer I de La Guardia (son) 1142-1180 (known as Berenguer Ibn Rubaytir)
Guillem I de La Guardia (nephew, regent)  before 1142, and before 1180
Berenguer II de La Guardia 1180-1208

Medieval Barcelona
Viscounts Barcelona
Barcelona
Viscounts